Milton McGriggs is a former American football quarterback who played one season with the Columbus Thunderbolts of the Arena Football League. He played college football at Fort Hays State University.

References

External links
Just Sports Stats

Living people
Year of birth missing (living people)
American football quarterbacks
Fort Hays State Tigers football players
Cleveland Thunderbolts players